Talio Pouli Magalei (8 March 1918 – 4 July 1978) was an American Samoan judge and politician. He served three terms in the Senate during the 1970s.

Biography
Magalei became a village judge and also temporarily served on the High Court. During World War II he joined the US Marine Corps as a medical surveyor.

In the 1972 elections he was elected to the Senate. He was subsequently re-elected in 1974 and 1976. He died in 1978 at the age of 60.

References

1918 births
People from Eastern District, American Samoa
American Samoan judges
Justices of the High Court of American Samoa
United States Marine Corps personnel of World War II
American Samoa Senators
1978 deaths
20th-century American politicians
20th-century American judges